DXYY (107.1 FM), broadcasting as 107.1 Radyo Natin, is a radio station owned and operated by Manila Broadcasting Company. The station's studio and transmitter are located in Kidapawan.

References

Radio stations established in 2002
Radio stations in Cotabato